HeavenFest was an annual Christian music festival attracting tens of thousands of people each summer.  The festival was held in multiple cities over the years along the Front Range of Colorado.

History
In its first two years, HeavenFest drew 12,500 and 23,000 people to the grounds of Northern Hills Church near Brighton, Colorado, a suburb of Denver.  The 2010 event brought in the Scream the Prayer Tour while changing locations to a field in Longmont and drawing over 35,000 attendees.  After one year in Longmont, The Ranch (Larimer County Fairgrounds and Events Complex) in Loveland became the new host of the festival.  After 2 years in Loveland, organizers cancelled the 2013 event for "a year of rest." In July 2014 it was announced on HeavenFest's Facebook page that the festival would return under new ownership and management after a two year hiatus. The 2015 event was held August 7–8 at Bandimere Speedway in Morrison and it was there they announced that HeavenFest would return to the dragstrip July 29th-30th 2016.

Past Artists
 Andy Mineo
 The Afters
 Alive City
 The Almost
 As I Lay Dying
 Biff Gore
 Blessed by a Broken Heart
 Brad Stine
 Braille
 Capital Kings
 The City Harmonic
 The Color Morale
 Colton Dixon
 Danny Oertli
 Derek Minor
 The Devil Wears Prada
 Disciple
 Everfound
 Facing West
 Fireflight
 For Today
 The Great Commission
 Group 1 Crew
 Haste the Day
 Hearts of Worship
  Hundredth
 Hymns for Hunger
 Icon for Hire
 Jaci Velasquez
 Jamie Grace
 Jeremy Camp
 KJ-52
 Lauren Daigle
 Lincoln Brewster
 Love and Death
 Mandisa
 Maylene and the Sons of Disaster
 Michael Gungor
 OC Supertones
 P.O.D.
 Petra
 Phil Keaggy 
 Propaganda
 Random Hero
 Raza For Christ
 Sanctus Real
 Seventh Day Slumber
 Shonlock 
 Skillet
 Sleeping Giant
 The Smiley Kids
 Spoken
 Stellar Kart
 Superchick
 Switchfoot
 Third Day
 Thousand Foot Krutch
 Trace Bundy
 Transform DJ's
 Trip Lee
 Underoath
 Unspoken
 Vertical Church Band
 White Collar Sideshow
 Worship Mob
 Zane Black

References

External links

 

Longmont, Colorado
Loveland, Colorado
Tourist attractions in Adams County, Colorado
Tourist attractions in Boulder County, Colorado
Christianity in Colorado
Music festivals in Colorado
2008 establishments in Colorado
Christian music festivals
Music festivals established in 2008